The 2019 Kwik Fit British Touring Car Championship (commonly abbreviated as BTCC) was a motor racing championship for production-based touring cars held across England and Scotland. The championship featured a mix of professional motor racing teams and privately funded amateur drivers competing in highly modified versions of family cars which are sold to the general public and conform to the technical regulations for the championship. The 2019 season was the 62nd British Touring Car Championship season and the ninth season for cars conforming to the Next Generation Touring Car (NGTC) technical specification. Colin Turkington successfully defended his title to equal Andy Rouse as the only four time BTCC Champions.

Teams and drivers
All teams and drivers competed under British racing licenses.

Drivers and teams changes
Changed teams
 Jack Goff secured a last-minute drive with RCIB Insurance with Fox Transport after Mike Bushell left the series for the Renault UK Clio Cup.
 Tom Oliphant will debut with Team BMW after driving for Ciceley Motorsport in 2018.
 Jason Plato and Rob Collard moved from Adrian Flux Subaru Racing and Team BMW to Sterling Insurance with Power Maxed Racing.
 Josh Cook moved from Power Maxed Racing to BTC Racing.
 Ollie Jackson moved from AmDTuning.Com to Team Shredded Wheat Racing with Gallagher.
 Sam Tordoff moved from Motorbase Performance to Cobra Sport AmD AutoAid/RCIB Insurance.
 Senna Proctor moved from Power Maxed Racing to Adrian Flux Subaru Racing.
 Jake Hill moved from Team HARD. to TradePriceCars.com.

Entering/re-entering BTCC
 Nicolas Hamilton returned to the series after racing in the Renault UK Clio Cup in 2017-18, driving a third car for Motorbase Performance under the RoKit Racing banner, having last raced in 2015.
 Ex-Formula One driver Mark Blundell made his series debut, with TradePriceCars.com.
 Mini Challenge UK drivers Rob Smith and Sam Osborne both made their series debut with Excelr8 Motorsport.
 2018 Ginetta GT4 Supercup Am champion Michael Crees made his series debut, with GKR Scaffolding with Autobrite Direct.
 Daniel Rowbottom made his series debut, with Ciceley Motorsport.

Leaving BTCC
 Mike Bushell left the series for the Renault UK Clio Cup to open up a space in Team HARD's BTCC line-up.
 Ethan Hammerton left the series to compete in the Renault UK Clio Cup with Team HARD.
 2018 TCR UK champion Daniel Lloyd left the series to race in the 2019 TCR Europe and TCR China Touring Car series.
 Sam Smelt left the series to race in the British GT Championship with Árón Taylor-Smith.
 Rob Austin left the series as he was unable to secure an entry into the 2019 season.
 Brett Smith left the series to compete in the VW Racing Cup

Team changes
 West Surrey Racing switched from running the BMW 125i M Sport to the newer BMW 330i M Sport.
 BTC Racing switched from running the Honda Civic Type R (FK2) to the newer Honda Civic Type R (FK8).
 AmDTuning.Com switched their two MG6 GTs for two Honda Civic Type R (FK2).
 HMS Racing left the series as they were unable to secure an entry into the 2019 season.
 Eurotech Racing withdrew from the BTCC after the 2018 season.

Mid season changes
 Laser Tools Racing switched from running the Mercedes-Benz A-Class to the Infiniti Q50 after the Oulton Park round.
 Sam Tordoff withdrew from the season ahead of the Knockhill round for personal reasons. Mike Bushell replaced him for the remainder of the season.
 Nicolas Hamilton pulled out of the rest of the season after the Knockhill round due to sponsorship problems. Michael Caine subsequently replaced him for the remainder of the season.

Race calendar
The championship calendar was announced by the championship organisers on 13 June 2018. Rockingham Motor Speedway will be replaced in the calendar by a second Thruxton Circuit round.

Results

Championship standings

Notes
No driver may collect more than one point for leading a lap per race regardless of how many laps they lead.

Drivers' Championship
(key)

Manufacturers'/Constructors' Championship

Teams' Championship

Independent Drivers' Championship

Independent Teams' Championship

Jack Sears Trophy

References

External links

TouringCarTimes

British Touring Car Championship seasons
Touring Car Championship
British Touring Car Championship